Bluffton Airport  is a public use airport located one nautical mile (1.85 km) southeast of the central business district of Bluffton, in Hancock County, Ohio, United States. It is owned by the Village of Bluffton.  According to the FAA's National Plan of Integrated Airport Systems for 2009–2013, it is categorized as a general aviation facility.

Facilities and aircraft 
It has one runway designated 5/23 with an asphalt surface measuring 4,126 by 75 feet (1,258 x 23 m).

For the 12-month period ending May 15, 2008, the airport had 71,980 aircraft operations, an average of 197 per day: 99% general aviation, 1% air taxi, and <1% military.
At that time there were 24 aircraft based at this airport: 83% single-engine, 13% multi-engine and 4% helicopter.

References

External links 
 Aerial image as of 17 April 1988 from USGS The National Map
 

Airports in Ohio
Buildings and structures in Hancock County, Ohio
Transportation in Hancock County, Ohio